Thomas Enqvist defeated Michael Joyce in the final, 6–4, 6–3 to win the boys' singles tennis title at the 1991 Wimbledon Championships.

Seeds

  Karim Alami (second round)
  Thomas Enqvist (champion)
  Andriy Medvedev (third round)
  David Witt (first round)
  David Prinosil (second round)
  Grant Doyle (third round)
  Juan Garat (second round)
  Benny Wijaya (second round)
  Pavel Gazda (first round)
  Joshua Eagle (second round)
  Paul Kilderry (semifinals)
  Greg Rusedski (semifinals)
  Scott Gessner (quarterfinals)
  Kenneth Carlsen (quarterfinals)
  Stephen Gleeson (third round)
  Song Hyeong-keun (third round)

Draw

Finals

Top half

Section 1

Section 2

Bottom half

Section 3

Section 4

References

External links

Boys' Singles
Wimbledon Championship by year – Boys' singles